Podolepis lessonii is an erect annual herb native to Western Australia, belonging to the Asteraceae family.

Taxonomy
The species was first described in 1829 as Panaetia lessonii by the French botanist, Henri Cassini.<ref name=APNI>{{APNI2|id=92780|name=Podolepis lessonii}}</ref> The species epithet, lessonii, honours Monsieur Lesson who collected a specimen from King George Sound in 1826. The species was assigned to the genus, Podolepis, in 1867 by George Bentham. The name currently accepted by the Western Australian Herbarium is Panaetia lessonii Cass., because of the studies of Jeffrey Jeanes, who distinguished Panaetia from  the genera, Podolepis, Siemssenia and Walshia,'' using the following characters:

 the outer florets are all tubular; and
 the cypselas are minutely tuberculate and lack long finger-like papillae.

Distribution and habitat
It is found widely in Beard's South-West and Eremaean provinces, in many different habitats and soils.

References

External links
Podolepis lessonii occurrence data from the Australasian Virtual Herbarium

lessonii
Flora of Western Australia